Namdaebong is a mountain between the city of Wonju and the county of Hoengseong, in Gangwon-do, South Korea.

See also
 List of mountains in Korea

Notes

References
 

Mountains of South Korea
Mountains of Gangwon Province, South Korea
One-thousanders of South Korea